Gufram is an Italian seat and furniture manufacturer based in Barolo (Piedmont area) known for the influence it had in the field of industrial design and for helping to revolutionize the look of the furniture from the 1960s. Their sculptural art objects show the many influences of pop art, conceptual art, illusionism, naturalism and modern design.

History

Gufram was founded in 1966 as a brand of the creative lab for modern furniture production of the Fratelli Gugliermetto, active seat and chairs makers since 1952, in Grosso, Torino. Influenced in the early '60s avant-garde artistic culture in Torino and the radical architectural experimentation of those years, the Gugliermetto brothers began to study with the support of emerging artists and architects of the time new forms and new materials to use in the production of design projects.

The usage of polyurethane as insulating material in the transportation industry around 1970, and the definition of the system of cold pressing of it, allowed Gufram to start producing durable seating revolutionary aesthetics, which tightens the eye to Pop Art, structured padded with polyurethane foam.
Since 1965, Gufram follows the artistic direction of Giuseppe Raimondi (designer), who signs for different products, and helps the company to involve other artists and architects in the design, and planning of the early products and prototypes of the company. In 1968, Gufram presents its products under the name of Multipli (industrially reproduced art objects in limited edition) in the XIV Triennale in Milan, enjoying a considerable success with the public and press that encouraged the company to go further with their philosophy and production method explored up to that moment. 
International recognition took place in 1972, with an exhibition dedicated to Italian design entitled "Italy: The New Domestic landscape" curated by Emilio Ambasz staged at the Museum of Modern Art (MOMA) in New York, where they were first exposed, and subsequently acquired different Multipli for the museum's permanent collection. From that moment on, Gufram products officially entered into the history of design and in the main collection of recognized European and American museums such as the Metropolitan Museum of Art of New York, the Vitra Design Museum, the permanent collection the Triennale of Milan, the Centre Pompidou in Paris and the Art Museum of Denver in the USA. Over 30 years, Gufram implements its catalog of products with new collaborations while maintaining its headquarters in Piedmont until 2005, when the property is sold to the Poltrona Frau Group, which manages the brand until the end of 2011. Since the last months of 2011, after being purchased by entrepreneurs in the sector who wish to contribute to the revitalization of a historic brand of Italian design, the brand returns to Piedmont, settling in the new headquarters of Barolo, Piedmont.

Products

The Gufram catalogue consists in a number of limited edition pieces (Multipli) and open. The main products are:

 Alvar, chaise-longue by Giuseppe Raimondi - 1966.
 Margherita, table and chair by Giuseppe Raimondi and Ugo Nespolo - 1967.
 Pavèpiuma, carpet by Piero Gilardi - 1967.
 Sassi seating system by Piero Gilardi -1968. 
Part of the collection of the Metropolitan Museum of Art in New York.
Part of the collection of MOMA, the Museum of Modern Art in New York.
 Torneraj, armchair by Giorgio Ceretti, Pietro Derossi and Riccardo Rosso - 1968
Part of the collection of MOMA, the Museum of Modern Art in New York.
 Detecma, armchair by Tullio Regge  - 1968. 
Part of the collection of Triennale Design Museum in Milan.
 Puffo, seat by Giorgio Ceretti, Pietro Derossi and Riccardo Rosso - 1970 (in production)
 Pratone, seat by Giorgio Ceretti, Pietro Derossi and Riccardo Rosso - 1971 (in production) part of the 100 Masterpiece of Design in the Collection of Vitra Design Museum
 Bocca, sofa by Studio 65 - 1970 (in production). The design of this piece of design has been inspired by the portrait of Mae West painted by Salvador Dalí.
 Cactus, coat stand by Guido Drocco and Franco Mello - 1972 (out of production) part of the collection of the Smithsonian Cooper-Hewitt, National Design Museum in New York
 Capitello, seat displayed in the collection of the Metropolitan Museum of Art of New York   Attica, seat; Attica TL, table; Atticat, table by Studio 65 - 1972 (in production)
 Rumble, divan by Gianni Pettena - 1972
 Massolo, table by Piero Gilardi - 1974 (in production)
 Siedi-tee, seat by Laura Fubini, Francesco Mansueto, Marco Verrando - 2004 (in production)
 Dejeuner Sur L'Arbre, table by Gianni Arnaudo - 2004 (in production)
 BiancoCactus, coat stand by Guido Drocco and Franco Mello- 2007 (in production)
 Dark Lady and Pink Lady, sofa by Studio 65 - 2008 (in production)
 RossoCactus and NeroCactus, coat stand Guido Drocco and Franco Mello- 2010 (in production)
 Metacactus, coat stand by Guido Drocco and Franco Mello - 2012 (in production)

See also 

List of companies of Italy

References

External links 

Official Gufram website

Furniture companies of Italy
Italian brands
Design companies of Italy
Industrial design firms
Design companies established in 1952
Italian companies established in 1952
Manufacturing companies established in 1952